Nuno Borges and Francisco Cabral were the defending champions but chose not to defend their title.

Victor Vlad Cornea and Sergio Martos Gornés won the title after defeating Patrik Niklas-Salminen and Bart Stevens 6–3, 6–4 in the final.

Seeds

Draw

References

External links
 Main draw

Tenerife Challenger - Doubles
Tenerife Challenger